Pinehill is a small suburb in the East Coast Bays area of Auckland, New Zealand. Pinehill contains two shopping centres, one along East Coast Road and the other along Greville Road. The suburb has only recently grown because of the housing estates being built in the area for the rapidly growing Albany area. Pinehill is regularly serviced by buses which go to Takapuna and the Auckland city centre. The Auckland Northern Motorway passes to the west of the suburb.

Demographics

Pinehill had a population of 4,275 at the 2018 New Zealand census, an increase of 321 people (8.1%) since the 2013 census, and an increase of 1,575 people (58.3%) since the 2006 census. There were 1,155 households, comprising 2,043 males and 2,235 females, giving a sex ratio of 0.91 males per female. The median age was 33.6 years (compared with 37.4 years nationally), with 741 people (17.3%) aged under 15 years, 1,134 (26.5%) aged 15 to 29, 2,055 (48.1%) aged 30 to 64, and 345 (8.1%) aged 65 or older.

Ethnicities were 28.3% European/Pākehā, 2.6% Māori, 1.2% Pacific peoples, 68.4% Asian, and 3.6% other ethnicities. People may identify with more than one ethnicity.

The percentage of people born overseas was 68.1, compared with 27.1% nationally.

Although some people chose not to answer the census's question about religious affiliation, 57.3% had no religion, 30.0% were Christian, 0.1% had Māori religious beliefs, 2.5% were Hindu, 1.7% were Muslim, 3.6% were Buddhist and 0.6% had other religions.

Of those at least 15 years old, 1,230 (34.8%) people had a bachelor's or higher degree, and 321 (9.1%) people had no formal qualifications. The median income was $27,200, compared with $31,800 nationally. 522 people (14.8%) earned over $70,000 compared to 17.2% nationally. The employment status of those at least 15 was that 1,677 (47.5%) people were employed full-time, 522 (14.8%) were part-time, and 132 (3.7%) were unemployed.

Education
The school opened in 1997.

References

External links
 Pinehill School website

Suburbs of Auckland
North Shore, New Zealand